Josip Valčić (born 21 April 1984) is a retired Croatian handball player.

References

1984 births
Living people
Croatian male handball players
Sportspeople from Zadar
RK Zagreb players